Girlguiding Midlands is one of the nine regions and countries of Girlguiding UK. The Midland Region HQ is on Lower Church Street in Ashby-de-la-Zouch. The Chief Commissioner is currently Clare Shinton.

Counties
Girlguiding Midlands is subdivided into 11 Girlguiding UK Counties. These may not all correspond to the counties defined by the British government.

Birmingham
Derbyshire
Herefordshire
Leicestershire
Northamptonshire
Nottinghamshire
Shropshire
Staffordshire
Warwickshire
West Mercia
Worcestershire

See also
Register your daughter

Girlguiding

Become a volunteer

References

Girlguiding